John Charles Forty (7 March 1906 – 17 July 1928) was an Australian rules footballer who played with St Kilda in the Victorian Football League (VFL).

Family
The son of William Forty (1877-1967), and Lucy Forty (1877-1960), née Pollock, John Charles Forty was born in Clifton Hill, Victoria on 7 March 1906.

Football
He was cleared from Belgrave to St Kilda in April 1927.

Death
He died at his father's residence in Glen Huntly, Victoria on 17 July 1928.

Notes

References
 Holmesby, Russell * Main, Jim (2014),  The Encyclopedia of AFL Footballers: every AFL/VFL player since 1897 (10th ed.), (Seaford), BAS Publishing. 
 "Wells" (Samuel Garnet Wells (1885-1972)), "J. Forty, St. Kilda's 'Find'", The Herald, (Friday, 3 June 1927), p.16.

External links 

1906 births
1928 deaths
Australian rules footballers from Melbourne
St Kilda Football Club players
People from Clifton Hill, Victoria